The 1892 Doane Tigers football team represented Doane College in the 1892 college football season. Led by F. P. Reed in his only year as head coach, the Doane compiling a record of 1–1.

Schedule

References

Doane
Doane Tigers football seasons
Doane Tigers football